"M" Circle  is a commemorative traffic circle on the campus of the University of Maryland, College Park. Created in 1976 to celebrate the American Bicentennial, the circle is noted for the large floral "M" that sits in its center. The flowers that make up the "M" are replaced twice annually. Around 1,200 tulip bulbs are planted in the fall and after blooming, are then replaced with around 3,500 marigolds or vodka begonias in the spring. In 1986 and 1987, the graduating classes donated funds for lighting the M.

As part of the construction of the Purple Line route through campus, "M" Circle was relocated. The new "M" Circle is no longer in the middle of a traffic circle and instead sits as a mound on the campus's Engineering Fields, across the street from its original site. Work on the new circle was completed in 2020.

References

University of Maryland, College Park
1976 establishments in Maryland
Landmarks in Maryland
Roundabouts and traffic circles in the United States